Fired Up may refer to:

 Fired Up!, a 2009 comedy film
 Fired Up (TV series), an American sitcom
 Fired Up (video game), a vehicular combat game for the PlayStation Portable
 Fired Up (Dan Seals album)
 Fired Up (Alesha album), or the title song
 Fired Up (Randy Houser album), or the title song
 "Fired Up", a song by Jessica Simpson from A Public Affair
 "Fired Up!", a song by Funky Green Dogs from Get Fired Up

See also
 All Fired Up (disambiguation)